Marc Mongeon (born 10 January 1955) is a Canadian former wrestler who competed in the 1984 Summer Olympics. He is now a science and PE teacher for St Patrick's Regional Secondary School in Vancouver B.C. He was born on 10 January 1955 in Iroquois Falls, Ontario, Canada. He competed in the 1984 summer Olympics in Los Angeles for team Canada and was placed 7th in the final standings. In the 1979 Pan American Games 74.0 kg. freestyle category he finished third.

References

External links
 

1955 births
Living people
Olympic wrestlers of Canada
Wrestlers at the 1984 Summer Olympics
Canadian male sport wrestlers
Pan American Games bronze medalists for Canada
Pan American Games medalists in wrestling
Wrestlers at the 1979 Pan American Games
Medalists at the 1979 Pan American Games
20th-century Canadian people